The Al-Otaiba ambush was a successful military operation conducted on 26 February 2014 by Hezbollah against al-Nusra militants at Al-Otaiba, a village in East Ghouta, near Damascus, Syria. In the ambush, a long, single-file column of alleged al-Nusra Front fighters were obliterated by multiple, simultaneous IED blasts. They were then targeted by Hezbollah with additional secondary explosions and small-arms fire. Hezbollah received minor support from the Syrian Army in the ambush.

Various reports suggest that over 100 al-Nusra fighters were killed, which makes the ambush a major victory for Hezbollah. According to analysts, the operation may have tightened the government's grip on east Damascus.

Ambush

In early 2014, Hezbollah intelligence intercepted an al-Nusra Front plan to move a large group of men at night from the besieged East Ghouta, a slum near the capital city, to more defensible positions in the Qalamoun Mountains northeast of Damascus. Their path would take them along a well-worn infiltration route through the rural village of Al-Otaiba. The US Army and most sources report that the operation was planned by Hezbollah. The route and approximate time of the Nusra convoy was determined in advance, and IEDs were planted and concealed in advance of the travelers’ arrival.

1. Hezbollah reconnaissance and surveillance confirm recurring infiltration route of rebel insurgents.2. IEDs/military-grade munitions emplaced in kill zone for simultaneous command detonation.3. Hezbollah commander to initiate ambush with command detonation and automatic weapons fires.4. Support element prepares to videotape ambush for social media exploitation.5. Support elements occupy hidden positions with overlapping sectors of fire into kill zone.6. Hezbollah support element with heavy machinegun prepared to engage along entire length of kill zone.
At approximately midnight, the insurgents from al-Nusra front began moving. The Nusra fighters, who were traveling by convoy, exited their vehicles and for unclear reasons proceeded on foot. Around 2:45 A.M., the insurgents arrived at the ambush site in Al-Utayba.

7. Hezbollah security element alerts leader of 175-200 dismounted rebel insurgents approaching on trail.8. Hezbollah leader command detonates munitions once majority of enemy are in the kill zone. 9. Hezbollah support elements isolate enemy with automatic fires in designated sectors of fire of kill zone.10. Ambush and support elements contain and destroy rebels in kill zone.11. Support elements clear and exploit the kill zone after the ambush and report to cell leader.12. Hezbollah media cell videotapes ambush success. Rebel insurgent cells disperse and exfiltrate from area.

They were then attacked by Hezbollah, who detonated a field of IEDs and then targeted the survivors with machine guns in a successful battle of annihilation. The Salafist rebel group Jaish al-Islam denied reports that it had members in the ambush and said it suffered no casualties. Syrian state media claims most of the rebels were Saudi, Qatari, and Chechen nationals.

Media
The ambush was carefully filmed by Hezbollah cells and published by Al-Manar for propaganda purposes. Their video of the ambush shows that the attack had a primary wave of IED detonations, causing the brunt of the casualties, and then a smaller secondary wave.

Hezbollah's Al-Manar TV station reported that the fighters were trying to break out of Eastern Ghouta to join battles in either the town of Deraa or the Qalamoun mountains. The rebel group Jaish al-Islam claimed the dead were civilians, trying to escape a siege.

References

Attribution:
 

Military operations of the Syrian civil war in 2014
Military operations of the Syrian civil war involving the al-Nusra Front
Military operations of the Syrian civil war involving Hezbollah
Military operations of the Syrian civil war involving the Syrian government
Rif Dimashq Governorate in the Syrian civil war
Ambushes
February 2014 events in Syria